Frafra or Farefare may mean,
 Frafra people
 Frafra language (Gurene)